West Island is an island of the Andaman Islands. It belongs to the North and Middle Andaman administrative district, part of the Indian union territory of Andaman and Nicobar Islands.

Geography
The island falls in between Coco Islands and North Andaman Island. It lies in the western approach to the Cleugh Passage.

Administration
Politically, West Island is part of Diglipur Tehsil.

References

Further reading 

 Geological Survey of India

Islands of North and Middle Andaman district
Uninhabited islands of India
Islands of India
Islands of the Bay of Bengal